Michael Lowry may refer to:

 Michael Lowry (born 1953), Irish politician
 Michael Lowry (actor) (born 1968), American actor, one of several who played Jake Martin (All My Children)
 Michael Lowry (rugby union) (born 1998), Irish rugby union player
 Mike Lowry (1939–2017), American politician

See also 
 Mick Lowry (born 1960), Irish former Gaelic football player (Irish name Mícheál Ó Labhraí)
 Michael Lowery (born 1974), former American football player